Ban Noen (lit: slope county) is a historic neighbourhood and road junction in Siri Rat and Ban Chang Lo subdistricts, Bangkok Noi district, Thonburi side, Bangkok.  It is the three-way of  Itsaraphap, Rot Fai and Sutthawat roads, and it is also the end of the Itsaraphap road.

History
The name "Ban Noen" originated from "Ban Noen-Khai Luang" (บ้านเนิน-ค่ายหลวง), dating to the Thonburi period (1767–82), people in this area have careers making Khong wong (ฆ้องวง), Thai musical instruments that are made from metal by a casting and forgings method. Khong wong from Ban Noen are well known that good quality and reverberate. In addition, not far from here is also the location of another community is "Ban Bu" (บ้านบุ), a community with a bronze work casting career.  It is located on south bank of Khlong Bangkok Noi (Bangkok Noi canal) and during World War II, it is the only community of Thonburi side adjacent to the Imperial Japanese Army base. It was often bombed by Allied planes at night.

The people who lived near Ban Noen in the past, have careers making Khao maomai (ข้าวเม่าหมี่) (an old fashioned pounded unripe rice snack), a kind of traditional Thai snack since ancient times. At present, they have a career of Kalamae (กะละแม; Thai version of dodol) and Khaoniao daeng (ข้าวเหนียวแดง;  whole grain sticky rice cooked with sugar in various ways), which is the main food used in Songkran festival.

Nearby attractions

Transportation

BMTA bus: route 40, 42, 56, 68, 79, 80, 108, 175
Rot Ka Poh (type of Songthaew, a Thai minibus style): rout Rot Fai–Suanphak,  Siriraj–Khlong San, Siriraj–Talat Phlu
Chao Phraya Express Boat: Railway Station Pier (N11)
Chao Phraya Ferry Service: Wang Lang Pier or Siriraj Pier (N10)
SRT Southern Line: Charansanitwong Halt

See also
Ban Khamin

References 

Neighbourhoods of Bangkok
Bangkok Noi district
Road junctions in Bangkok